"Quevedo: Bzrp Music Sessions, Vol. 52" (also known as "Quédate") is a song by Argentine producer Bizarrap and Spanish rapper Quevedo. It was released on July 6, 2022, through Dale Play Records, with the music video released on Bizarrap's YouTube channel the following day. This is the sixth Bzrp Music Sessions to feature a Spanish artist, and the fourth to feature an artist from the Canary Islands.

Background 
The session was first teased during Villano Antillano's Session, in which during the 0:45 second, Residente's cap, which can be seen in the background in Bizarrap's desk, changes from an R to a Q, leading fans to suspect a future session with Quevedo.

The session was officially announced in July 4, 2022 through a promotional video on Bizarrap's Instagram, in which he made a special menu in a Burger King in Madrid, the bags which contained a toy of himself with a part of the chorus of the session, and delivered them himself.

Commercial performance 
"Quevedo: Bzrp Music Sessions, Vol. 52" reached number one in Latin American countries such as Argentina, Bolivia, Chile, Colombia, Ecuador, Mexico, Honduras, Paraguay and Peru; as well as topping the charts in Spain and Italy. Additionally, the song charted at number one on the Billboard Global 200 during its second week chart appearance. In the Billboard Hot 100, "Quevedo: Bzrp Music Sessions, Vol. 52" debuted at number 98 and reached a peak position of 79 later on. In the US Hot Latin Songs it peaked at number 10.

Music video 
The music video for "Quevedo: Bzrp Music Sessions, Vol. 52" was released on YouTube on July 6, 2022 which shows both Bizarrap and Quevedo performing the song. During the 2:28 second, a cameo of SpongeBob's Patrick Star can be seen. It was later blurred out due to a subsequent lawsuit by Nickelodeon. The song was viewed more than 10 million times within the first twenty-four hours of its release. As of January 20, 2023, the video has accumulated 430 million views on YouTube.

Charts

Weekly charts

Monthly charts

Year-end charts

Certifications

See also 
 List of Billboard Argentina Hot 100 number-one singles of 2022
 List of Billboard Global 200 number ones of 2022
List of Billboard Hot Latin Songs and Latin Airplay number ones of 2022

Notes

References

External links 
 

2022 songs
2022 singles
Argentina Hot 100 number-one singles
Billboard Global 200 number-one singles
Billboard Global Excl. U.S. number-one singles
Bizarrap songs
Number-one singles in Italy
Song recordings produced by Bizarrap